Cuthbert Conyers, DCL was Archdeacon of Carlisle from 1510 until 1520.

Conyers was born in Marske and educated at Cambridge University. He held livings at Marske, Whenby, Hutton Rudby and Wem.

References

Archdeacons of Carlisle
Alumni of the University of Cambridge
16th-century English people
People from the North Riding of Yorkshire (before 1974)